Turoar is a locality in the Rural City of Swan Hill, Victoria, Australia. Towan Plains Reserve is in the locality of Turoar and has powdered gypsum and salt. Turoar post office opened on 15 November 1919 and was closed on 31 October 1942.

References

Towns in Victoria (Australia)
Rural City of Swan Hill